Chief Monoquet (or Muh-neck-o-it) also known as:  Menoga, Minoquet, Menucquett, Menoquet, Manquett (c. 1775) was a Native American Chief within the Potawatomi tribe in Indiana during the 19th century. He's said to have become a young warrior around the age of 15, and was the most influential chiefs of the five that were residing in Kosciusko County when white people started settling in the county in 1832. His birth date is unknown but in 1835 was estimated to be 60 years old, making his estimated birth year 1775.

Chief Monoquet was a Potawatomi leader who lived in the late 17th and early 18th centuries in what is now the state of Indiana in the United States. He was a prominent figure in the Potawatomi tribe and was known for his military and political leadership.

Chief Monoquet played a key role in shaping the Potawatomi's relationship with European settlers, particularly the French. He initially supported the French in their conflicts with other Native American tribes, but later grew disenchanted with the French and became more aligned with the British. He was also known for his efforts to maintain the Potawatomi's autonomy and independence in the face of increasing pressure from European settlers.

While there are various accounts of Chief Monoquet's life and legacy, he is generally remembered as an important leader and advocate for his people during a time of significant change and upheaval.

Appearance 
Around 1835, William C. Graves, an early resident of the local town of Leesburg, IN (also the first school teacher of the same town and Kosciusko county) took it upon himself to leave a record of the current Indian chiefs of Kosciusko before their removal soon after.
Below is a quote from his description:In 1836 Chief Monoquet was about sixty years of age, a rather spare man above the medium height, of a dark color, high forehead, small bright eyes, aquiline nose and stern countenance, and looking as though he inherited all the antipathy of his race to the whites.

His village 
His village was located over three acres of land along the north bank of the Tippecanoe River at IN-15 N and Monoquet Road in Kosciusko County, Indiana. The land during his time contained about fifteen bark-covered wigwams scattered randomly over the land.

Migration to Kansas 
The Native Americans of Kosciusko County were eventually forced to migrate to Kansas. Chief Monoquet died before his band was forcibly removed.

Mysterious death 
His death was attributed to poisoning which tribesmen thought was given to him by a Native American woman who had been visiting from Michigan.It is said that Monoquet died of lung fever as the result of a prolonged debauch. At the time a handsome young squaw from some tribe in Michigan was on a visit to his village, and, on account of the sudden death of the chief the woman, to whom it is believed he had been attentive, was suspected by certain members of the tribe to have poisoned him. The rumor, reaching her ears, threw her into a panic of fear and she started on foot alone for her Michigan home. Her flight but confirmed the suspicions of the tribe and two young braves were sent in pursuit of the fugitive. One of the warriors overtook her at the crossroads south of Leesburg and brained her with his tomahawk. Two early settlers who were coming down the road, Joseph Harper and Harrison Pool, witnessed the cowardly murder, and approached the two Indian braves. One of the Indians flourished his tomahawk and exclaimed exultantly "Waugh! Big Indian me". Mr. Harper, the plain white man, replied: "Yes, big Indian you, to run down and brain a defenseless squaw!" Then raising his gun, he added: "For a fip I'd put a bullet through your cowardly heart." But the Indians sneaked off to seek a more appreciative audience.

Further reading 
 A standard history of Kosciusko County, Indiana : an authentic narrative of the past, with particular attention to the modern era in the commercial, industrial, educational, civic and social development.
 Monoquet: Influential Indian Chief - Kosciusko County
 Indians of Kosciusko County
 Indians Haunt County Lands, Hiding Clues  To Society White Men Wiped Out
 Kosciusko County Old Jail Museum Hosts ‘Find Chief Monoquet’ Tour
 Chief Monoquet - InkFreeNews.com
 Archive.org - (159 results for "Monoquet")

References 

18th-century Native Americans
1775 births
19th-century Native Americans
1836 deaths
Potawatomi people
Indiana Historical Society
Native American history of Indiana
Kosciusko County, Indiana
Native American leaders
Native American people of the Indian Wars
Native American people from Indiana